Rouyn-Noranda Airport  is located  east southeast of Rouyn-Noranda, Quebec, Canada.

The airport houses the headquarters of Propair.

Airlines and destinations

References

External links

Page about this airport on COPA's Places to Fly airport directory

Certified airports in Abitibi-Témiscamingue
Transport in Rouyn-Noranda